Ngaoundal is a town in the Adamawa Province of Cameroon. It is located at 6° 30" North, 13° 16" East.  The town is home to a regional airport.  Bauxite is mined nearby.

Transport 

The town is served by the Cameroon Railway which is crossed by a paved highway.

See also
Communes of Cameroon

References 

 Neba, Aaron, Ph.D. (1999) Modern Geography of the Republic of Cameroon, 3rd ed. Bamenda: Neba Publishers.
 "Ngaoundal". Tageo.com. Accessed 23 May 2006.

Populated places in Adamawa Region